Jennifer Han (born June 25, 1983) is an American professional boxer who held the IBF female featherweight title from 2015 to 2020, and was the first world champion boxer from El Paso, Texas. As of July 2021, she is ranked as the world's sixth best active female lightweight by BoxRec.

Professional career
Han made her professional debut on July 31, 2009, losing via majority decision (MD) over four rounds against Melissa St. Vil at the Pan American Center in Las Cruces, New Mexico.

After compiling a record of 10–2–1 (1 KO), she challenged reigning champion Ji-Hye Woo for the IFBA featherweight title on March 23, 2014, at the Wooseul Gymnasium in Haenam, South Korea. Han suffered the third defeat of her career, losing via ten-round MD. Two judges scored the bout 97–95 and 96–93 in favor of Woo while the third judge scored it a draw at 95–95.

Two fights later, she was scheduled to face Helen Joseph on April 18, 2015, with the vacant IBF female featherweight title on the line. However, Joseph was forced to withdraw from the bout after she was unable to obtain a VISA to enter the U.S.. Fatuma Zarika stepped in as a late replacement, with Han emerging victorious via unanimous decision (UD) to capture the vacant IBF female Intercontinental featherweight title. The fight with Joseph for the vacant IBF world title was rescheduled for September 19, and took place at the Don Haskins Center in El Paso, Texas. Han captured her first world title via UD with the judges' scorecards reading 98–91, 98–92 and 97–92. With the victory, Han became the first world champion boxer from El Paso.

After two successful defences of her world title, Han faced Olivia Gerula on February 17, 2017, at the Don Haskins Center. At the pre-fight weigh-in, Gerula weighed 1.5 lbs over the maximum weight limit, making her ineligible to contest for the IBF championship. With the title still on the line for Han, she made a successful defence, winning via UD with all three judges scoring the bout 100–89.

She made one more defence–a UD victory against Lizbeth Crespo in February 2018–before taking two years away from the sport after giving birth to a child in May 2019. Han returned to the ring on February 15, 2020, scoring an eight-round UD victory against Jeri Sitzes in a non-title bout.

Han relinquished her title in July 2020, and has moved up to the lightweight division. Her first fight at the weight is scheduled to take place on September 4, 2021, at the Headingley Rugby Stadium in Leeds, England, against reigning champion Katie Taylor for the undisputed female lightweight championship. The bout will be streamed live on DAZN as part of the co-main event for the rematch between Josh Warrington and Mauricio Lara.

Professional boxing record

References

External links

Living people
1983 births
American women boxers
Boxers from Texas
Sportspeople from El Paso, Texas
World featherweight boxing champions
Super-featherweight boxers
International Boxing Federation champions
21st-century American women